Kudkelli is a village in Bhamragad Taluka, Gadchiroli district, Maharashtra, India.

Geography
Kudkelli is a village located in Dandakaranya the jungle of punishment which is mentioned in the great epic like Ramayana & Mahabharata.  This village is surrounded by river called Bhandiya. The native known as Madiya by profession they are hunter turned out farmers. Every person in village has his own farm and the main food grain is rice they produce in.

Ethnicity
The village is known as the village of the Madiya tribes and the Veladi (Atram) are the main clan of this village. The language of native people is Madiya but in around 18th century those Telugu people landed in the jungle for the purpose business. as they found the scope in the jungle some of the Telugu businessmen settled over their and now they also the part of this jungle as well as community.

Education
This is the village which had produced most educated people in the jungle. rather the first graduate from the jungle is from Kudkelli. Apart from that Kudkelli has produced a great Marathi author name M.D. Ramteke who has written books like "Amhi Madiya" and "Stupanchi Mandire" 

Villages in Gadchiroli district